These are the rosters of all participating teams at the men's water polo tournament at the 2000 Summer Olympics in Sydney.

Australia
The following players represented Australia:

Sean Boyd
Eddie Denis
Andriy Kovalenko
Daniel Marsden
Craig Miller
Tim Neesham
Mark Oberman
Rod Owen-Jones
Rafael Sterk
Nathan Thomas
Grant Waterman
Thomas Whalan
Gavin Woods

Croatia
The following players represented Croatia:

Samir Barać
Alen Bošković
Elvis Fatović
Igor Hinić
Ivo Ivaniš
Vjekoslav Kobešćak
Ognjen Kržić
Višeslav Sarić
Mile Smodlaka
Dubravko Šimenc
Siniša Školneković
Ratko Štritof
Frano Vićan

Greece
The following players represented Greece:

Georgios Afroudakis
Nikolaos Deligiannis
Filippos Kaiafas
Thomas Khatzis
Theodoros Chatzitheodorou
Theodoros Lorantos
Konstantinos Loudis
Georgios Mavrotas
Dimitrios Mazis
Georgios Psykhos
Georgios Reppas
Ioannis Thomakos
Antonios Vlontakis

Hungary
The following players represented Hungary:

Tibor Benedek
Péter Biros
Rajmund Fodor
Tamás Kásás
Gergely Kiss
Zoltan Kósz
Tamás Marcz
Tamás Molnár
Barnabás Steinmetz
Zoltán Szécsi
Bulcsú Székely
Zsolt Varga
Attila Vári

Italy
The following players represented Italy:

Alberto Angelini
Francesco Attolico
Fabio Bencivenga
Leonardo Binchi
Alessandro Calcaterra
Roberto Calcaterra
Alberto Ghibellini
Amedeo Pomilio
Francesco Postiglione
Carlo Silipo
Leonardo Sottani
Stefano Tempesti
Antonio Vittorioso

Kazakhstan
The following players represented Kazakhstan:

Roman Chentsov
Konstantin Chernov
Sergey Drozdov
Aleksandr Elke
Askar Orazalinov
Yevgeny Prokhin
Artemy Sevostyanov
Aleksandr Shvedov
Yury Smolovoy
Igor Zagoruyko
Ivan Zaytsev
Yevgeny Zhilyayev
Denis Zhivchikov

Netherlands
The following players represented the Netherlands:

Marco Booij
Bjørn Boom
Bobbie Brebde
Matthijs de Bruijn
Arie van de Bunt
Arno Havenga
Bas de Jong
Harry van der Meer
Gerben Silvis
Kimmo Thomas
Eelco Uri
Niels Zuidweg

Russia
The following players represented Russia:

Roman Balashov
Revaz Chomakhidze
Dmitri Dugin
Sergei Garbuzov
Dmitry Gorshkov
Nikolay Kozlov
Nikolay Maksimov
Andrei Rekechinski
Dmitry Stratan
Yuri Yatsev
Aleksandr Yeryshov
Marat Zakirov
Irek Zinnurov

Slovakia
The following players represented Slovakia:

Karol Bačo
Sergej Charin
Milan Cipov
István Gergely
Gejza Gyurcsi
Jozef Hrošík
Róbert Káid
Martin Mravík
Alexander Nagy
Peter Nižný
Peter Veszelits
Juraj Zaťovič

Spain
The following players represented Spain:

Ángel Andreo
Daniel Ballart
Manuel Estiarte
Pedro Francisco García
Salvador Gómez
Gabriel Hernández
Gustavo Marcos
Daniel Moro
Iván Moro
Sergi Pedrerol
Jesús Rollán
Javier Sánchez
Jordi Sans

United States
The following players represented the United States:

Gavin Arroyo
Tony Azevedo
Ryan Bailey
Dan Hackett
Chris Humbert
Sean Kern
Kyle Kopp
Chi Kredell
Robert Lynn
Sean Nolan
Chris Oeding
Brad Schumacher
Wolf Wigo

Yugoslavia
The following players represented Yugoslavia:

Aleksandar Ćirić
Danilo Ikodinović
Viktor Jelenić
Nikola Kuljača
Dejan Savić
Aleksandar Šapić
Aleksandar Šoštar
Petar Trbojević
Veljko Uskoković
Jugoslav Vasović
Vladimir Vujasinović
Nenad Vukanić
Predrag Zimonjić

References

Men's team rosters
 
2000